The Appalachian State Mountaineers football team is the intercollegiate American football team representing Appalachian State University in Boone, North Carolina. The Mountaineers have competed in the Football Bowl Subdivision (FBS) and the Sun Belt Conference since 2014. Appalachian plays its home games in Kidd Brewer Stadium, named after former head coach Kidd Brewer, whose 1937 squad was unbeaten and unscored upon during the regular season, outscoring opponents 206–0.

Through its history, the Appalachian State football program has won some 648 games, claimed three NCAA Championships, and appeared in either a bowl game or, alternatively, the Division I FCS playoffs, some 35 times. The Mountaineers have 22 conference championships and have one of the nation's best home field advantages by winning percentage. The program boasts a back-to-back Walter Payton Award winner, Armanti Edwards, the first ever to win in consecutive years (2008, 2009). Appalachian's all-time winning percentage of .649 ranks 16th among all programs.

The Mountaineers competed in the Football Championship Subdivision (FCS) from its founding in 1978 to 2013. They won three straight national championships from 2005 to 2007, the first FCS team to do so since the playoffs began in 1978. Appalachian is also the first Division I program to win three consecutive national championships since Army accomplished the feat from 1944 to 1946, and the first Division I school in the modern era to claim three straight undisputed national titles. When FCS Appalachian State defeated No. 5 Michigan in 2007, it was the first time an FCS team had defeated any ranked FBS program. Appalachian State then tallied votes itself and become the first FCS team to receive votes in a final Associated Press (AP) college football poll. The Mountaineers received five points in the poll.

Appalachian State moved on from FCS to FBS in 2014, and has already enjoyed AP Top 25 rankings during several of its seasons (e.g., 2018, 2019, 2020) in FBS. The Mountaineers finished the 2019 season with a final AP poll ranking at No. 19 (and Coaches No. 18) after winning its fifth straight bowl game, third straight Sun Belt Championship, and statement victories over both UNC and USC in out-of-conference matchups at Chapel Hill and Columbia. With a 6–1 record in modern NCAA-sanctioned bowl games, Appalachian has the highest bowl winning percentage of any football program to have played in five or more.

History

Early history (1928–1970) 
Appalachian State began playing organized football in 1928. The coach that first year was Graydon Eggers. The Mountaineers competed as an independent before joining the National Association of Intercollegiate Athletics (NAIA) North State Conference as a charter member in 1931. Kidd Brewer was the head coach of the Mountaineers from 1935 to 1938, leading the team to two postseason bowl games. Brewer's 1937 squad is best remembered for going unbeaten and unscored upon during the regular season, outscoring opponents 206–0 before losing a postseason game to Southern Miss, 7–0. Appalachian found continued success under coach E. C. Duggins (1947–50 and 1952–55). During Duggins' eight years as coach, the Mountaineers claimed three more North State Conference championships and played in seven bowl games. The Mountaineers again competed as an independent from 1968 to 1971 before joining the Southern Conference.

Jim Duncan served as Appalachian State's head coach from 1960 to 1964, compiling a 31–15–2 record. Duncan was succeeded by Carl Messere, who compiled a 34–26–1 record from 1965 to 1970.

Jim Brakefield era (1971–1979) 
Wofford head coach Jim Brakefield was hired as Appalachian State's head football coach in 1971. He led the Mountaineers into the Southern Conference in his first season. Brakefield led the Mountaineers to three losing seasons in four years en route to a 47–48–4 record at Appalachian State, however, a 3–8 campaign in 1979 resulted in his dismissal.

However, Brakefield's 1975 team won impressive victories over Wake Forest (19–17) and South Carolina (35–34) in 1975.

Mike Working era (1980–1982) 
Mike Working served as the 16th head football coach in Appalachian State football history from 1980 to 1982. Under Working, the Mountaineers compiled a record of 13–18–2 and never were able to sustain consistency. Working was fired following back to back seven-loss seasons in 1981 and 1982.

Mack Brown (1983) 

Mack Brown was hired as Appalachian State's head coach in 1983, his first such role. Brown previously served as LSU's quarterbacks coach and led Appalachian State to a 6–5 record in his only season.

In December 1983, he was seriously considered for the head coaching position at LSU which had been vacated after Jerry Stovall was fired, but the position instead went to Miami Dolphins defensive coordinator Bill Arnsparger. However, Brown chose to leave Appalachian State to accept the position of offensive coordinator at Oklahoma under head coach Barry Switzer.

Sparky Woods era (1984–1988) 
Following Brown's departure, Appalachian State promoted assistant coach Sparky Woods to head coach. Appalachian State won the first of nine Southern Conference championships in 1986 under Woods, who also led the Mountaineers into the playoffs for the first time that year. Another conference championship and playoff appearance followed in 1987. Woods won the Wallace Wade Coach of the Year Award three straight years in 1985, 1986, and 1987, becoming the only coach in conference history to do so. Woods, who compiled a 38–19–2 record at Appalachian State, left to accept the head coaching position at South Carolina after five seasons.

Jerry Moore era (1989–2012) 

Arkansas assistant coach Jerry Moore was hired as the Mountaineer's 19th coach in 1989. Moore is the winningest coach in conference history, and under his leadership the Mountaineers won seven conference championships. In addition, the Mountaineers posted 19 winning campaigns to go with one losing season during his tenure, allowing Moore to claim Southern Conference Coach of the Year honors a record six times. He was also the 2006 recipient of the Eddie Robinson Award, presented to the division's most outstanding coach. Under the stewardship of Moore, players such as two-time Buck Buchanan Award winner Dexter Coakley have gone on to play in the National Football League.

Appalachian State became the first team since the playoffs began in 1978 to win three straight national titles in 2005, 2006, and 2007, and the first team to accomplish the feat since Army in 1944, 1945, and 1946. They are also the first Division I school in modern times to claim three straight undisputed national titles.

On September 1, 2007, in what was hailed as one of the biggest upsets in American sports history, the Mountaineers shocked the fifth-ranked Michigan Wolverines, 34–32. Most people predicted that Michigan was going to win by a large margin—in fact, the unofficial odds were that Michigan was going to win by 33 points. The win helped Appalachian State become the first FCS team to ever receive votes in the final Associated Press (AP) college football poll on January 8, 2008. The Mountaineers received five points in the poll, tying South Florida for 34th. The conclusion of the 2008 season saw quarterback Armanti Edwards win Appalachian's first Walter Payton Award, presented annually to the most outstanding offensive player.

On December 2, 2012, after a first-round home playoff loss to Illinois State, athletics director Charlie Cobb announced that Moore would not return for the 2013 season. According to a press release issued by the ASU athletic department, Cobb stated that he and Moore agreed after the end of the 2011 season that the 2012 season would be Moore's last as head coach, but chose not to make an announcement until that time. However, several days later, Moore claimed that there had been a communication gap, and that he had wanted to coach for one more season (i.e., 2013).

Scott Satterfield era (2013–2018) 

On December 14, 2012, Scott Satterfield was named head coach of the Appalachian State football program. Satterfield had spent 15 seasons as an assistant in the Mountaineers program. As the offensive coordinator, he was responsible for much of the program's success.

In 2013, the Mountaineers began a two-year transition from the FCS to college football's premier FBS level. Because of this, the program was declared ineligible for FCS postseason play. Appalachian State's first year of FBS play would come in 2014 as a member of the Sun Belt Conference. However, per NCAA rules, the Mountaineers would not be eligible for the FBS post-season until 2015.

The first game of App State's inaugural FBS season was a rematch of the 2007 Appalachian State vs. Michigan football game. However, this time, the Michigan Wolverines won in a 52–14 blowout. The Mountaineers had their first home game of the season the following week in a win against Campbell. App State would lose its next four contests. After a 1–5 start, the Mountaineers rallied and won the final six games of their 2014 season. The team finished 7–5 overall (6–2 Sun) with a third place conference finish in their first season as a member of the Sun Belt Conference.

Appalachian State opened the 2015 season with a 49–0 pounding of Howard before losing to Clemson. After their 1–1 start, the Mountaineers won six straight but fell short to the eventual Sun Belt champion, Arkansas State, on November 5. The team rallied, finished the regular season 10–2 and received a bid to play in the Camellia Bowl against an 8–4 Ohio. The Mountaineers overcame their opposition 31–29 becoming the first team in Sun Belt history to win 11 games in one season. This win was also historic as it marked the first time a former FCS team won a bowl game in their first season of bowl eligibility.

On November 24, 2015 Miami confirmed rumors they have scheduled a home-and-home series with Appalachian State. The first game was played in Kidd Brewer Stadium on September 17, 2016, and marked the Mountaineers' first home game against a power five opponent in modern history. The second game was played in Sun Life Stadium on September 11, 2021., with Miami narrowly winning 25–23.

In 2016, the Mountaineers finished with a 10–3 record.

In 2018, Appalachian State was ranked in the FBS for the first time in its history after starting out 5–1 in the 2018 season; its only recorded loss was to Penn State in an overtime game. They would promptly lose their next game and their ranking. The Mountaineers would end the 2018 season as Sun Belt Conference Champions. Satterfield would be named Sun Belt Conference Coach of the Year. It was the Mountaineers' 3rd Conference championship in a row and their first outright championship in the inaugural Sun Belt Championship game hosted in Boone on December 1, 2018. On December 4, 2018, Scott Satterfield was confirmed to be the next head coach of the Louisville Cardinals football program. Assistant Head Coach Mark Ivey would be named interim Head Coach and would go on to coach the Mountaineers for the 2018 R+L Carriers New Orleans Bowl win over Middle Tennessee State University Blue Raiders, 43–13. Ivey would not be retained as head coach of the Mountaineers. The Mountaineers ended their season 11–2, winning a fourth consecutive bowl game and finishing as 3-peat Sun Belt champions.

Eliah Drinkwitz (2019) 
Eliah Drinkwitz was hired by Appalachian State on December 13, 2018. He was previously the offensive coordinator for NC State.

After a 12–1 regular season including a dramatic last-second win (on a blocked field goal) over Mack Brown's in-state flagship UNC Tar Heels program and a win over Louisiana in the Sun Belt Championship Game for a fourth consecutive Sun Belt championship, Drinkwitz left after just one season to become the new head coach at Missouri.

Shawn Clark era (2019–present) 
Shawn Clark was hired as the 22nd head coach in program history on December 13, 2019. Clark, a 1998 graduate of the university, played under Moore and coached under Satterfield as well as Drinkwitz. He led the Mountaineers to a 31–17 victory over UAB Blazers in the New Orleans Bowl. Clark's first full season as head coach of the Mountaineers was met with complications from the COVID-19 Pandemic, which caused many changes to schedules and football operations around the country. The team persevered and Clark finished 9–3 and lead the team in the inaugural Myrtle Beach Bowl to defeat the North Texas Mean Green with a dominating performance by the offense, 56–28. Clark had thus led the Mountaineers to their 5th and 6th consecutive bowl wins since Appalachian State joined the FBS tier of Division I.

On September 10, 2022, Clark lead the Mountaineers to a 17–14 victory over 6th ranked Texas A&M, the programs second win against a top 10 ranked opponent, and first since Michigan in 2007. This victory helped App State secure the school's first visit from College GameDay.  However, the season ultimately turned out to be a disappointment for the program, as they missed bowl eligibility for the first time since their move to the FBS.

Conference affiliations 
 Independent (1928–1930, 1968–1971) 
 North State Conference (1931–1960)
 Carolinas Conference (1961–1967)
 Southern Conference (1972–2013)
 Sun Belt Conference (2014–present)

Championships

National championships 

Appalachian has won three national championships in the NCAA Division I Football Championship Subdivision, at the time, the highest division in college football to hold a playoff tournament to determine its champion. The Mountaineers became the fifth program in FCS history to reach the national title game three straight years joining Eastern Kentucky (1979–82), Georgia Southern (1988–90 and 1998–2000), Marshall (1991–93) and Youngstown State (1991–94). Appalachian also had a 13-game postseason winning streak, a record for consecutive wins in contiguous years that ended with a loss to Richmond in 2008.

Conference championships 

Appalachian State has won 22 conference titles, 16 outright and six shared. 
Before leaving the Southern Conference in 2014, the Mountaineers had won 10 conference titles, placing them second in the league's history. The Furman Paladins lead the SoCon with 12 championships.

† Co-champions

Division championships

Bowl games 

The Mountaineers' have played in 16 bowl games; their record so far is 9–7. Their first nine bowl games are listed in NCAA records, but the games were not considered NCAA-sanctioned bowls.

NCAA records list the date of the first Pythian Bowl as "11-26-1949", which is inconsistent with contemporary newspaper reports.

Head coaches 

Note: Appalachian did not field a team in 1943 or 1944.

Rivalries

Georgia Southern 

Known as Deeper than Hate, Appalachian State enjoys a fierce Sun Belt Conference rivalry with Georgia Southern. This rivalry has been described by many as "the best rivalry in the Group of Five." Appalachian State holds a 20–15–1 lead through the 2021 season.

Marshall 

Nicknamed The Old Mountain Feud, Appalachian State competes in a rivalry with fellow Appalachian mountain-based public university Marshall. The rivalry game was played annually 1977–1996. From 1986 to 1996 the Southern Conference foes won at least a share of the conference title a combined eight times. The rivalry resumed annual play in the 2020 season and is set to continue as Marshall joins Appalachian State in the Sun Belt Conference East Division in 2022. Appalachian State leads the total series, 15–9.

Western Carolina 

Known as the Battle for the Old Mountain Jug, Appalachian State played Western Carolina in a regional rivalry game from 1932 to 2013. The only years in that period in which the game was not played were 1942 to 1945, during U.S. involvement in World War II. In 1976, a traveling trophy known as the Old Mountain Jug was created from an old moonshine jug. Appalachian's record in games played is 59–18–1, and 31–7 in the Jug era. The Mountaineers hold the trophy, having won each of the last nine games (2005–2013) and 26 of the last 28. No further games in the rivalry are scheduled following Appalachian's move to the Sun Belt Conference.

Other 
Appalachian State has developed less historic, but still competitive, rivalries with Coastal Carolina, Louisiana, and Charlotte. The Mountaineers had an annual rivalry with Wake Forest from 1985 to 2001 known as "The Black and Gold Rivalry." The rivalry was renewed once in 2017 and has been dormant since.

Stadium

College Field (1928–61) 
College Field was the home of Appalachian football from 1928 to 1961. Located at the future site of Rankin Hall and Edwin Duncan Hall, the stadium was replaced by Kidd Brewer Stadium in 1962.

Kidd Brewer Stadium (1962–present)

Opened in 1962, Kidd Brewer Stadium was originally named Conrad Stadium after former university trustee and R.J. Reynolds executive William J. Conrad. The stadium was renamed in 1988 for Kidd Brewer who coached the Mountaineers from 1935 to 1938. The stadium was the first venue in either North or South Carolina to install artificial turf. On October 3, 1970, the Mountaineers and Elon Fightin' Christians staged the first ever game played on turf in the Carolinas. After a 2002 First Round I-AA playoff loss to Maine, Appalachian compiled a 30-game unbeaten streak at Kidd Brewer Stadium that ended on October 20, 2007.

The Mountaineers led the FCS in average attendance throughout the 2007, 2008, and 2010 seasons. Kidd Brewer saw average crowds of 24,219, 25,161 and 25,715 respectively.

Renovations
Completed in 2009, the stadium has seen extensive renovations as part of a $50 million facilities improvement campaign. An upper deck with additional seating for 4,400 was added to the east (visitor) stands prior to the 2008 season. Additional restrooms and concessions have been added. Most significantly, rising behind the west (home) stands and replacing the former pressbox facilities, the  KBS Complex was completed before the start of the 2009 season. The KBS Complex includes new stadium entrance plaza, strength and conditioning rooms, a hydrotherapy room, locker rooms, athletics offices, stadium suites and club seating.

On February 28, 2017, the Appalachian State athletics office announced a construction project to increase the size of the video display board in Kidd-Brewer Stadium. The proposed video board is approximately 2,500 square feet (50' x 90'), with LED display, 13HD technology and a Daktronics custom audio system integrated into the video board. The cost of the project was estimated to be approximately $60 million and was completed prior to the 2017 season.

Appalachian State constructed a new field house in the North End-zone to replace the 45-year-old Owens Field House which was demolished in February 2019. The new field house project had a budget of $45 million and added 1,000 new seats to Kidd Brewer Stadium. The new field house includes athletic training, hydrotherapy and locker rooms, and nutrition science research areas, as well as conference and continuing education training space, potential medical office space, dining facilities, a team store and ticketing office, and offices for coaches and athletics staff. The project was completed in time for the 2021 football season.

Notable games

2002 Furman Paladins 

The Miracle on the Mountain took place at Kidd Brewer Stadium on October 12, 2002, and was selected as the "ABC Sports Radio Call of the Year." In a low-scoring affair, the Paladins elected to attempt a two-point conversion after scoring the go-ahead touchdown with 7 seconds left in the game. Leading 15–14, Furman quarterback Billy Napier's pass was intercepted by Josh Jeffries at the 4-yard line. He lateraled the ball to Derrick Black who returned it for a score giving the Mountaineers a 16–15 win.

2007 Michigan Wolverines 

On September 1, 2007, the Appalachian State football team traveled to Ann Arbor to play their season opener at the University of Michigan. A sellout crowd of over 109,000 fans packed Michigan Stadium, becoming the largest crowd to ever witness an ASU football game. Appalachian State beat AP No. 5 Michigan 34–32 and became the first FCS football team to defeat an FBS team ranked in the AP poll. This victory was seen by some analysts to be one of the greatest upsets in NCAA football history. Following the win, they were featured on the cover of the following week's issue of Sports Illustrated.

2018 Sun Belt Championship 

On December 1, 2018, Appalachian State played in and won the first ever Sun Belt Championship Game, hosting the Ragin' Cajuns of University of Louisiana at Lafayette at Kidd Brewer Stadium. This momentous game, broadcast on ESPN, saw the Mountaineers come out on top 30–19. This gave the Mountaineers a berth to the 2018 New Orleans Bowl, which Appalachian State won 45–13 over Middle Tennessee State.

2019 North Carolina Tar Heels 
On September 21, 2019, the Mountaineers defeated North Carolina. Appalachian entered the game as a 3-point underdog against UNC and their returning coach Mack Brown. UNC opened the game with a long kick off return followed by a one play touchdown to take the lead 7–0. App State responded with 20 unanswered points including a Demetrius Taylor fumble recovery for a touchdown and Darrynton Evans rushing touchdown set up by Demtrius Taylor's interception. UNC came back to cut the halftime score to 27–17 in favor of Appalachian State.
UNC scored first in the 3rd quarter to cut the lead to 27–24. The Mountaineers responded with a four-play touchdown drive capped with Darrynton Evans' 3rd rushing touchdown of the game. UNC scored again in the 4th quarter and kept Appalachian's offense in check, bringing the score to 34–31 Mountaineers in the final minutes. With 40 seconds left UNC drove down the field and lined up to attempt a 56-yard field with 5 seconds left. App State linebacker Akeem Davis-Gaither burst through the line and tipped the ball to solidify the Mountaineer victory.

2019 Sun Belt Championship 

On December 7, 2019, Appalachian State also played in and won the second ever Sun Belt Championship Game, again hosting the Ragin' Cajuns of University of Louisiana at Lafayette at Kidd Brewer Stadium. The Mountaineers won an offense-laden game, 45–38. Appalachian State went on to win the 2019 New Orleans Bowl over UAB, 31–17.

2022 Texas A&M Aggies 
On September 10, 2022, the Mountaineers faced off against Texas A&M. With the Aggies ranked sixth in the week's Associated Press poll, Appalachian State was a 19-point underdog after falling in a narrow 63-61 decision against North Carolina in opening week play. Thanks to an offensive effort that controlled the ball for over 41 minutes of game time, the Mountaineers earned an improbable 17–14 victory, earning their first win over a top 10 opponent since the triumph over Michigan. The final scoring effort was an 18-play, 63-yard drive that took over nine minutes to finish before Michael Hughes kicked a 29-yard field goal. The Aggies missed a field goal on their own final possession, allowing App State to run out the final 3:43.

Individual award winners

National award winners – players 

Buck Buchanan Award
FCS National Defensive Player of the Year
1995: Dexter Coakley
1996: Dexter Coakley

Buck Buchanan Award Finalists
1995: Dexter Coakley (1st)
1996: Dexter Coakley (1st)
1999: Corey Hall (N/A)
2000: Joe Best (13th)
2001: Josh Jeffries (7th)
2002: Josh Jeffries (8th)
2003: K.T. Stovall (11th)
2005: Marques Murrell (9th)
2006: Marques Murrell (3rd) & Jeremy Wiggins (9th)
2007: Corey Lynch (2nd)
2008: Mark LeGree (3rd)
2009: Mark LeGree (5th)
2012: Jeremy Kimbrough (2nd) & Demetrius McCray (16th)

Walter Payton Award
FCS National Offensive Player of the Year
2008: Armanti Edwards
2009: Armanti Edwards

Walter Payton Award Finalists
2004: DaVon Fowlkes (3rd) & Richie Williams (15th)
2005: Richie Williams (6th)
2006: Kevin Richardson (12th)
2007: Kevin Richardson (10th)
2008: Armanti Edwards (1st)
2009: Armanti Edwards (1st)
2010: DeAndre Presley (3rd)
2011: Brian Quick (15th)
2012: Jamal Jackson (14th)

National award winners – coaches 
Eddie Robinson Award
National Coach of the Year
2006: Jerry Moore

American Football Coaches Association (AFCA)
National Coach of the Year
2005: Jerry Moore
2006: Jerry Moore
2007: Jerry Moore

Southern Conference honors 

Male Athlete of the Year
Bob Waters Award
1979–80: Rick Beasley
1986–87: John Settle
1995–96: Dexter Coakley
1996–97: Dexter Coakley
2004–05: DaVon Fowlkes
2005–06: Richie Williams
2006–07: Marques Murrell
2009–10: Armanti Edwards

Offensive Player of the Year
Roy M. "Legs" Hawley Award (media)
1979: Rick Beasley (media)
1986: John Settle (media)
2004: DaVon Fowlkes (coaches and media)
2005: Richie Williams (coaches and media)
2006: Kevin Richardson (coaches and media)
2008: Armanti Edwards (coaches and media)
2009: Armanti Edwards (coaches and media)
2010: DeAndre Presley (coaches and media)

Defensive Player of the Year
1987: Anthony Downs (media)
1991: Rico Mack (media)
1992: Avery Hall (coaches and media)
1994: Dexter Coakley (coaches and media)
1995: Dexter Coakley (coaches and media)
1996: Dexter Coakley (coaches and media)
2002: Josh Jeffries (coaches and media)
2003: K.T. Stovall (coaches)
2006: Marques Murrell (coaches)
2007: Corey Lynch (coaches and media)
2008: Jacque Roman (coaches)
2012: Jeremy Kimbrough (coaches)

Freshman of the Year
1983: John Settle (media)
1985: Tim Sanders (media)
1991: Chip Hooks (coaches and media)
1993: Dexter Coakley (coaches and media)
2006: Armanti Edwards (coaches and media)
2012: Sean Price (coaches and media)

Jacobs Blocking Trophy
1976: Gill Beck
1977: Gill Beck
1987: James Hardman
1989: Derrick Graham
2005: Matt Isenhour
2006: Kerry Brown
2007: Kerry Brown
2009: Mario Acitelli

Coach of the Year
Wallace Wade Award (media)
1985: Sparky Woods (media)
1986: Sparky Woods (media)
1987: Sparky Woods (media)
1991: Jerry Moore (coaches and media)
1994: Jerry Moore (coaches and media)
1995: Jerry Moore (coaches and media)
2005: Jerry Moore (coaches and media)
2006: Jerry Moore (coaches and media)
2008: Jerry Moore (coaches and media)
2009: Jerry Moore (coaches and media)
2010: Jerry Moore (coaches and media)

Sun Belt Conference honors 

Offensive Player of the Year
2016: Jalin Moore
2018: Zac Thomas
2019: Darrynton Evans
Defensive Player of the Year
2015: Ronald Blair
2019: Akeem Davis-Gaither
2021: D’Marco Jackson

Freshman of the Year
2014: Taylor Lamb
2016: Clifton Duck
Newcomer of the Year
2021: Chase Brice
Coach of the Year
2018: Scott Satterfield

Other awards and honors 
Kirkland Blocking Trophy
1964: Larry Hand

National Statistical Champion
1936: Len Wilson (scoring)
1974: Joe Parker (punting)
1979: Rick Beasley (receiving)
1991: Harold Alexander (punting)
1992: Harold Alexander (punting)
2004: DaVon Fowlkes (receptions, receiving yards, all-purpose yards)

Hall of Fame selections 

College Football Hall of Fame
2011: Dexter Coakley
2014: Jerry Moore

Southern Conference Hall of Fame
2011: Dexter Coakley
2014: Jerry Moore

Retired numbers

Future non-conference opponents
Announced schedules as of August 29, 2022.

References

External links 

 

 
American football teams established in 1928
1928 establishments in North Carolina